Blastomussa is a genus of large polyp stony corals. It is unclear in which family this genus belongs. Members of this genus are sometimes found in reef aquariums.

Species
The World Register of Marine Species recognises the following species:
Blastomussa loyae Head, 1978
Blastomussa merleti (Wells, 1961)
Blastomussa omanensis (Sheppard & Sheppard, 1991)
Blastomussa simplicitexta (Umbgrove, 1942) †
Blastomussa vivida Benzoni, Arrigoni & Hoeksema, 2014
Blastomussa wellsi Wijsman-Best, 1973

References

External links
 ReefCorner Database Entry - Blastomussa merleti

Scleractinia genera
Enigmatic animal taxa